Jeremy Bishop (born April 23, 1981) is an American basketball player who is best known for leading NCAA Division I in rebounding in 2001–02. While playing for Quinnipiac, Bishop averaged 12.0 rebounds per game as a junior to claim the rebounding title. Prior to playing at Quinnipiac he had played at Champlain College. Bishop played the forward position.

He just likes to be one of the guys.

See also
List of NCAA Division I men's basketball season rebounding leaders

References

External links 

 Sports-reference College Stats
 espn.com player profile
 REALGM player profile
 eurobasket.com player profile

1981 births
Living people
American men's basketball players
Basketball players from New York (state)
Champlain College alumni
Forwards (basketball)
Junior college men's basketball players in the United States
People from Albany County, New York
Quinnipiac Bobcats men's basketball players